The Lady Eve is a 1941 American screwball comedy film written and directed by Preston Sturges and starring Barbara Stanwyck and Henry Fonda.

The film is based on a story by Monckton Hoffe about a mismatched couple who meet on board an ocean liner. In 1994, The Lady Eve, which is included on many "Top 100" films of all-time lists, was selected for preservation in the United States National Film Registry by the Library of Congress as being "culturally, historically, or aesthetically significant."

Plot

Jean Harrington is a beautiful con artist. Along with her equally larcenous father, "Colonel" Harrington, and his partner Gerald, she is sailing on an ocean liner with the intention to fleece rich, naive Charles Pike, the heir to the Pike Ale ("The Ale That Won for Yale") fortune. Charles is a woman-shy snake expert just returning from a year-long expedition up the Amazon. The young women aboard the ship compete for his attention, but Charles is more concerned with reading about snakes.

Jean meets Charles by tripping him as he passes, and he is soon smitten with her. After Jean runs off, terrified by a real snake that Charles has brought on board which has gotten loose in his cabin, the two share a steamy scene in her cabin.

Charles's minder Muggsy suspects that Jean is a trickster looking to steal from Charles, but Charles refuses to believe him. Then, despite the planned con, Jean falls in love with Charles and shields him from her card sharp father. Muggsy discovers the truth and presents proof to Charlie, who dumps Jean.

Furious at being scorned, Jean soon re-enters Charles's life masquerading as the posh Lady Eve Sidwich, niece of Sir Alfred McGlennan Keith, another con man who has been swindling the rich of Connecticut. Jean takes on an English accent, determined to torment Charles mercilessly, as she explains, "I've got some unfinished business with him—I need him like the axe needs the turkey."

When Charles meets Jean as Lady Eve, he is so bewildered at her resemblance to the Jean that he knew that he constantly trips and falls over himself. Although Muggsy tries to convince him that "she's the same dame," Charles reasons that Jean would not come close to his home without at least disguising herself. Then, after Sir Alfred feeds him a story that the Lady Eve is Jean's sister, Charles accepts the resemblance. After a brief courtship they marry, right on Jean's schedule. And just as she had planned, on the train to their honeymoon Eve begins to confess her past, continuously dropping names of many old boyfriends and lovers. A disgusted Charles jumps off the train.

Jean's con team urges her to close the deal by pursuing a huge divorce settlement, but she tells Charles' father on the phone that she wants no money, but only wants Charles to tell her that their marriage is over in person. Charles refuses. Jean is then told by Charles' father that Charles is departing on another ocean voyage. She arranges passage for herself and her father, and meets Charles again by tripping him as he passes, just as they had met before. Charles is overjoyed to see the real Jean again, kisses her and takes her hand, and they dash to her cabin where they mutually affirm their love for each other. As the cabin door closes Charles confesses that he is married, and Jean replies, "So am I, darling."

Cast

Production

The Lady Eve was loosely based on a 19-page story by Monckton Hoffe called "Two Bad Hats," which was also the working title for the film. Sturges was assigned to write a script based on Hoffe's story in 1938, with Claudette Colbert expected to be the star. Sturges and Paramount producer Albert Lewin had some written disagreement in 1939 about the development of the script. Lewin wrote to Sturges, "[T]he first two-thirds of the script, in spite of the high quality of your jokes, will require an almost one hundred percent rewrite." Sturges objected, and eventually Lewin acceded, writing, "Follow your witty nose, my boy; it will lead you and me and Paramount to the Elysian pastures of popular entertainment."

The Hays Office initially rejected the script because of "the definite suggestion of a sex affair between your two leads" that lacked "compensating moral values," and a revised script was submitted and approved.

At some point, the studio wanted Brian Aherne for the male lead, and Joel McCrea, Madeleine Carroll and Paulette Goddard were under consideration as of July 1940, but in August 1940, Fred MacMurray and Madeleine Carroll were announced as the film's co-stars. In September, Darryl Zanuck lent Henry Fonda to co-star with Goddard, who was then replaced by Barbara Stanwyck.

Production took place from October 21 to December 5, 1940. According to Donald Spoto in Madcap: The Life of Preston Sturges, Sturges "... invariably paraded on [the] set with a colorful beret or a felt cap with a feather protruding, a white cashmere scarf blowing gaily round his neck and a print shirt in loud hues ... the reason for the peculiar outfits, he told visitors, was that they facilitated crew members finding him amid the crowds of actors, technicians, and the public." Stanwyck compared Sturges's set to "a carnival." In his biography of Stanwyck, author Axel Madsen wrote: "The set was so ebullient that instead of going to their trailers between setups, the players relaxed in canvas chairs with their sparkling director, listening to his fascinating stories or going over their lines with him. To get into mood for Barbara's bedroom scene, Sturges wore a bathrobe."

Location shooting for the opening jungle scene took place at Lake Baldwin of the Los Angeles County Arboretum and Botanic Garden in Arcadia, California. In that scene, Fonda's character refers to Professor Marsdit, whose last name is an anagram of that of Raymond L. Ditmars of the American Museum of Natural History, a well-known reptile expert and popular science writer of the time.

The film premiered in New York City on February 25, 1941, and went into general release on March 21. It was marketed with a number of taglines, including "When you deal a fast shuffle ... love is in the cards." The film ranked among the top-grossing films of the year.

The Lady Eve was released on video in the U.S. on July 12, 1990 and was rereleased on June 30, 1993. Despite issues with the condition of the surviving original film elements, the film was scanned in 4K and issued on Blu-ray disc by Criterion on July 14, 2020.

Production credits

 Preston Sturges – director, screenplay
 Paul Jones – producer
 Victor Milner – director of photography
 Hans Dreier – art direction
 Ernst Fegté – art direction
 Sigmund Krumgold – musical direction
 Stuart Gilmore – editor
 Edith Head – costumes
 Harry Lindgren – sound recording
 Don Johnson – sound recording
 Monckton Hoffe – story

Reception and themes
After The Lady Eve premiered at the Rialto, The New York Times reviewer Bosley Crowther characterized the film as "a sparkling romantic comedy." He further described the director's work: "It isn't often that this corner has good reason to bang a gong and holler 'Hurry, hurry, hurry!' As a matter of fact, it is all too rare indeed that we have even moderate provocation to mark a wonder of the cinematic world. Too many of the films on which we comment boil down to woeful mediocrity, and too many of the people who make them betray a depressing weariness." More than 50 years later, Roger Ebert gave the film high praise: "If I were asked to name the single scene in all of romantic comedy that was sexiest and funniest at the same time, I would advise beginning at six seconds past the 20-minute mark in Preston Sturges's The Lady Eve."

Some have identified a theme of gender inversion, with Jean Harrington clearly in control for the majority of the film until her feelings get in the way of her original intentions. Until she realizes that she loves Charles, there is little sense of the struggle between equals that typifies most romantic comedies. The film has been lauded for a unique blend of slapstick and satire. Film scholars have observed the theme of the fall of man implied by the film's title; in the literal sense, the fall is evidenced in Pike's frequent pratfalls, and figuratively, he falls from innocence as he is lured into Jean's deceptive plots.

Film critic Andrew Sarris identifies the theme of deceptiveness throughout the film, with things as small as the distinction, or lack thereof, between beer and ale, as well as the various disguises of Jean Harrington, adding depth to the plot line. Most of the characters have two names (Charles is Hopsie, Jean is Eve Sidwich); this lack of recognition sets the stage for the storyline. Sturges repeatedly suggests that the "lowliest boob could rise to the top with the right degree of luck, bluff and fraud."

Awards and honors
At the 14th Academy Awards, the film was nominated for Best Original Story for Monckton Hoffe but Here Comes Mr. Jordan (Harry Segall) proved victorious. The National Board of Review nominated the film for Best Picture, and The New York Times named it as the best film of 1941. In 1994, The Lady Eve was selected for preservation in the United States National Film Registry by the Library of Congress as being "culturally, historically, or aesthetically significant". In 2008, The Lady Eve was selected by Empire magazine as among the 500 greatest movies of all time and one of the best 1,000 by The New York Times. In 2012, the film ranked #110 on Sight and Sound'''s critics' poll and #174 on the directors' poll as selected by the British Film Institute. The Lady Eve was listed by Time magazine as one of the All-TIME 100 Movies. The film ranked 59th on Entertainment Weekly's list of the 100 greatest films of all time. FilmSite.org, a subsidiary of American Movie Classics, placed The Lady Eve on its list of the 100 greatest films. Films101.com ranked the film as the 97th best film of all time.The Lady Eve appears on two of the American Film Institute's lists and was nominated for several others:
 1998: AFI's 100 Years...100 Movies – Nominated
 2000: AFI's 100 Years... 100 Laughs - #55
 2002: AFI's 100 Years... 100 Passions - #26
 2005: AFI's 100 Years...100 Movie Quotes:
 Jean Harrington: "I need him like the axe needs the turkey." – Nominated
 2007: AFI's 100 Years...100 Movies (10th Anniversary Edition) – Nominated
 2008: AFI's 10 Top 10:
 Nominated Romantic Comedy Film

The Writers Guild of America ranked its screenplay as the 52nd best ever written.

Influences
In 1956, the plot of The Lady Eve was recycled for the film The Birds and the Bees starring George Gobel, Mitzi Gaynor and David Niven. Preston Sturges received a co-writer credit for the film, although he did not actually participate in the project.

The plot was also employed as the model for Corrupting Dr. Nice, a 1997 science fiction novel by John Kessel involving time travel.

Barbara Stanwyck's Jean Harrington was one of the key reference points James Mangold came up with for Phoebe Waller-Bridge to employ in her performance as Helena Shaw in the upcoming 2023 film Indiana Jones and the Dial of Destiny, the fifth and last Indiana Jones movie.

Radio adaptationThe Lady Eve was presented on Hollywood Star Time on September 21, 1946, with Joan Blondell and John Lund in the starring roles.

References

Notes

Bibliography

 Coursodon, Jean-Pierre. American Directors: Volume I. New York: McGraw-Hill, 1983. .
 Curtis, James. Between Flops: A Biography of Preston Sturges. New York: Limelight Editions, 1984. .
 Faith, Kathleen. The Unruly Woman: The Politics of Confinement & Resistance. Austin, Texas: University of Texas Press, 1995. .
 Nochimson, Martha. "The Lady Eve and Sullivan's Travels" in Cineaste, Vol. 27, Issue 3, Summer 2002.
 Sarris, Andrew. The American Cinema: Directors And Directions 1929–1968. New York: E.P. Dutton, 1995, first edition 1968. .

External links

 
 
 
 
 
 The Lady Eve an essay by James Harvey at the Criterion Collection
 The Lady Eve'' essay by Daniel Eagan in America's Film Legacy: The Authoritative Guide to the Landmark Movies in the National Film Registry, Bloomsbury Academic, 2010 , pages 332-333 

1941 films
1941 romantic comedy films
1940s screwball comedy films
American black-and-white films
American crime comedy films
American films with live action and animation
American romantic comedy films
American screwball comedy films
Comedy of remarriage films
Films about con artists
Films based on works by Monckton Hoffe
Films directed by Preston Sturges
Films set on ships
Films with screenplays by Preston Sturges
Paramount Pictures films
United States National Film Registry films
Films set in Connecticut
1940s American films